The Lumpa Church, an independent Christian church, was established in 1953 by "Alice" Lenshina Mulenga in the village of Kasama, Northern Rhodesia (Zambia). The church promoted a blend of Christian and traditional religious values and practices, including a belief in the role of women as spiritual mediums.

Origin
The group began with the ideals of Alice Mulenga Lubusha who rechristened herself Alice Lenshina or essentially "Alice Regina." The group was what could be deemed the "eradication movement" in African religion. It strongly opposed polygamy and sorcery.

Further narration
By 1958 the organization adopted the controversial rejection of all earthly authority. It began having its own courts and refused to pay taxes or be registered with the state. This led to a confrontation known as the "Lumpa uprising"  soon after Zambia became independent. This violent confrontation led to the deaths of approximately 700 members and the arrest of Alice Lenshina. Alice was released in 1975, but imprisoned two years later for trying to revive the movement's strength. The Catholic Lay movement Legion of Mary adopted some of their hymns and thus converted some of the former members, although the Lumpa Church itself is said to survive and split into various churches - Jerusalem Church, Uluse Kamutola Church, New Jerusalem Church, Siloam Church.

See also
 Alice Lenshina
 History of Church activities in Zambia

References

External links
Alice Lenshina biographical information
Anthropological case study of Lumpa

Churches in Zambia
Christian new religious movements
Christian organizations established in 1953
1953 establishments in Northern Rhodesia